Syed Akram Hossain is a Bangladeshi academic scholar. He is known for his research and analysis of Rabindranath Tagore's work, which makes him an important part of Bangladesh literature. He was awarded Rabindra Purushkar in 2016 by the Bangla Academy and Ekushey Padak in 2017 by the Government of Bangladesh in the research category.

Career
Hossain served as a faculty member of the Department of Bengali at the University of Dhaka. He founded Ulukhagra, a modern literary journal and served as its editor.

Works
 Rabindranather Uponnash: Deshkal o Shilparup (1969)
 Rabindranather Uponnash: Cetonalok o Shilparup (1977)
 Rabindranath's Novel: Patterns of Thought and Representation (2015)

References

Living people
Academic staff of the University of Dhaka
Recipients of the Ekushey Padak
Place of birth missing (living people)
Year of birth missing (living people)
Bangladeshi people of Arab descent